Kigumba Petroleum Institute, also referred to as Uganda Petroleum Institute or as Uganda Petroleum Institute, Kigumba (UPIK), is a government-owned, national center for training, research and consultancy in the field of petroleum exploration, recovery, refinement and responsible utilization in Uganda.

Location
The coordinates of the Institute's campus are: 01°50'34.0"N, 32°01'09.0"E (Latitude:1.842778; Longitude:32.019167).

History
The institute was established in 2009 and admitted the first batch of students in 2010, with the objective of training personnel in petroleum-related skills, at certificate, diploma and undergraduate levels. In 2011, increased budgetary allocations were made towards the elevation of the institute from a vocational school to a fully-fledged International University. Financial assistance to the tune of US$8 million (UGX:20 billion), will be sought from the World Bank and Irish Aid, to achieve this goal. In November 2011, the  Uganda Government began the process of elevating the Institute to University status.

Recent developments
In 2014, the institute introduced five new internationally recognized programs to graduate "highly qualified and specialized" technicians needed by oil companies across the world. The new plan proposes wide ranging overhaul of the curriculum and the introduction of five new diploma courses in oil studies. The institute also plans to work in close collaboration with the Ugandan oil industry to graduate over 220 students annually by the year 2019, up from 54 in 2014.

Courses
As of November 2019, the institute offers three diploma courses:

 Diploma in Petroleum Engineering
 Diploma in Upstream Petroleum Operations
 Diploma in Downstream Petroleum Operations.

See also

References

External links
 Website of Uganda Petroleum Institute Kigumba (UPIK)
 Oil sector wants 30,000 workers
 Petroleum institute collapsing
 Grooming professionals in the oil sector
 Kigumba oil college in crisis

Universities and colleges in Uganda
Bunyoro sub-region
Educational institutions established in 2009
Kiryandongo District
2009 establishments in Uganda
Petroleum infrastructure in Uganda
Petroleum engineering schools